Haltern am See (Haltern at the lake, before December 2001 only Haltern) is a town and a municipality in the district of Recklinghausen, in North Rhine-Westphalia, Germany. It is situated on the Lippe and the Wesel–Datteln Canal, approx.  north of Recklinghausen.

History
Former Halteren was founded on February 3 in 1289. They received the town charter by the prince-bishop of Münster, Everhard von Dienstag.

During Kristallnacht (1938), the town's synagogue, Jewish cemetery and the houses and shops belonging to the town's Jews were vandalised. Jews were deported to concentration camps, the last five of whom were deported in January 1942. Only one of the town's Jews survived the Holocaust: Alexander Lebenstein, after whom a school is named.

In March 2015, the town received international attention when 16 students and two teachers from the Joseph-König-Gymnasium in Haltern, were killed in the Germanwings Flight 9525 crash in the French Alps. They were on their way home from a student exchange with the Giola Institute in Llinars del Vallès, Catalonia, Spain. Haltern's mayor, Bodo Klimpel, described it as "the darkest day in the history of our city."

Gallery

Notable people
 Benedikt Höwedes, former footballer for Juventus F.C. and Germany, was born in the city
 Joseph König (1843–1930), chemist, after whom the Joseph-König-Gymnasium is named, was born in Lavesum in Haltern
 Alexander Lebenstein, Holocaust survivor, after whom the Alexander-Lebenstein-Realschule is named, was born in Haltern
 Christoph Metzelder, former footballer for Borussia Dortmund and Schalke 04, was born in the city
 Bodo Klimpel, mayor of Haltern am See between 2004 and 2020, was born in Rourkela, State of Odisha, India
 Luba Goy, German-Canadian actress and comedian, was born in Haltern in 1945 and emigrated to Canada with her parents in 1951

Twin towns – sister cities

Haltern am See is twinned with:
 Roost-Warendin, France
 Sankt Veit an der Glan, Austria

References

External links

 Livius.org: Roman fortress Haltern

Towns in North Rhine-Westphalia
Members of the Hanseatic League
Recklinghausen (district)
Holocaust locations in Germany